RCAF Station Souris was a Second World War British Commonwealth Air Training Plan (BCATP) station located near Souris, Manitoba, Canada. It was operated and administered by the Royal Canadian Air Force (RCAF).

History

World War II
Souris hosted No. 17 Service Flying Training School (No. 17 SFTS). The school opened 8 March 1943 and closed 30 March 1945. Aircraft used included the Harvard and Anson. Emergency, or relief, landing fields were located at Hartney and Elgin.

Aerodrome information 
The aerodrome was listed as under construction and serviceable. Five runways were listed as follows:

A review of Google Maps on 10 June 2018 shows that only the inner 14/32 runway remains as hard surfaced.  The outer 14/32 runway and the two former 2/20 runways have been reclaimed for agricultural use. A review of the Souris Glenwood Industrial Air Park page shows the former 8/26 runway is still maintained as turf.

Relief landing field – Hartney
The primary relief landing field (R1) for RCAF Station Souris was located approximately 19 miles south-west. The site was located approximately 1 mile south of the now unincorporated community of Hartney, Manitoba. The relief field was laid out in the standard triangular pattern. Three runways were listed as follows:

A review of Google Maps on 10 June 2018 shows a clear outline of the aerodrome at the posted coordinates.

Relief landing field – Elgin
The secondary relief landing field (R2) for RCAF Station Souris was located approximately 10 miles south. The site was located approximately 3 miles north of the unincorporated community of Elgin, Manitoba. The relief field was turf with a triangular runway layout. Three runways were listed as follows:

A review of Google Maps on 10 June 2018 shows no identifiable trace of the former aerodrome in the vicinity of the posted coordinates.

Present
The aerodrome is now the Souris Glenwood Industrial Air Park.

References

External links
 Bruce Forsyth's Canadian Military History Page

Royal Canadian Air Force stations
Military airbases in Manitoba
Military history of Manitoba
Airports of the British Commonwealth Air Training Plan
Canadian Forces bases in Canada (closed)